Life Is to Whistle is a 1998 Cuban film directed by Fernando Pérez

Plot synopsis 
The film tells the stories of three end-of-the millennium Cubans, whose lives intersect on the Day of Santa Barbara (the African Saint Chango, ruler of destinies). Mariana, a ballerina, ponders breaking chastity vows she made to land the coveted role of Giselle; Julia has fainting spells each time she hears the word "sex," and Elpidio, a musician, seduces a gringa tourist while Bebe, the narrator, takes the viewer for a taxi ride along the streets of Havana.

Accolades 
Life is to Whistle won the Grand Coral at the Havana Film Festival in 1998.

See also 

 List of Cuban films

External links
 

1998 films
Cuban comedy-drama films
Films set in Havana
1990s Spanish-language films